William Benjamin Dearborn Simmons (b. Cambridge, Massachusetts, April 27, 1823 - d. there, Oct. 31, 1876) was an American organ builder.

Simmons apprenticed under Thomas Appleton and founded his own business in 1845 along with Thomas McIntyre. From 1851 he ran the business alone, and in 1856 George Fisher became partner. From 1858 to 1860 he and John Henry Willcox were partners in the firm.

Simmons's organs were some of the first to use a full Swell division, and he was an innovator in the use of tempered tuning and of steam-powered machinery in construction. In the 1850s his organs took on more Germanic qualities. Among his most important instruments were the 1855 organ built for Dover Hall in Boston, the 1859 organ for Harvard University, and the 1860 organ for St. Paul's Cathedral in Louisville, Kentucky.

References
Barbara Owen, "William Benjamin Dearborn Simmons". The New Grove Dictionary of Music and Musicians online.

Further reading
O. Ochse: The History of the Organ in the United States (Bloomington, IN, 1975)
B. Owen: The Organ in New England (Raleigh, NC, 1979)
B. Owen: ‘John Henry Willcox: Organist and Organ Builder’,The Tracker, 36/4 (1992), pp. 13–24

1823 births
1876 deaths
American pipe organ builders
Musical instrument manufacturing companies of the United States